The 2002 Memorial Cup occurred May 18–26 at the Guelph Sports and Entertainment Centre in Guelph, Ontario. It was the 84th annual Memorial Cup competition and determined the major junior ice hockey champion of the Canadian Hockey League (CHL). It featured the host team, the Guelph Storm, as well as the winners of the Ontario Hockey League, Quebec Major Junior Hockey League and the Western Hockey League: the Erie Otters, Victoriaville Tigres and the Kootenay Ice respectively. The Kootenay Ice won their first Memorial Cup, beating the Victoriaville Tigres in the final.

Round-robin standings

Scores
May 18: Guelph 5–1 Victoriaville
May 19: Kootenay 3–0 Erie
May 20: Kootenay 4–3 Guelph
May 21: Erie 5–1 Victoriaville
May 22: Victoriaville 3–2 Kootenay
May 23: Erie 4–0 Guelph

Tie-breaker
May 24: Victoriaville 4–3 Guelph

Semi-final
May 25: Victoriaville 5–4 Erie (OT)

Final
May 26: Kootenay 6–3 Victoriaville

Winning team
Igor Agarunov, Bryan Bridges, B. J. Boxma, Nigel Dawes, Gerard Dicaire, Brennan Evans, Cole Fischer, Curtis Fransoo, Travis Featherstone, Richard Hamula, Chris LaValley, Dale Mahovsky, Steve Makway, Duncan Milroy, Shaun Norrie, Tomas Plihal, Kyle Sheen, Colin Sinclair, Jarret Stoll, Marek Svatos, Adam Taylor, Andy Thompson, Craig Weller. Coach: Ryan McGill

Scoring leaders
Matthew Lombardi, VIC (2g 7a) 9p
Cory Pecker, ER (4g 3a) 7p
Danny Groulx, VIC (2g 5a) 7p
Carl Malette, VIC (5g 1a) 6p
Colin Sinclair, KOO (4g 2a) 6p
Kevin Dallman, GUE (1g 5a) 6p
Brad Boyes, ER (2g 3a) 5p
Brandon Cullen, ER (2g 3a) 5p
Marek Svatos, KOO, (1g 4a) 5p
Jarret Stoll, KOO (0g 5a) 5p

Goaltending leaders
T. J. Aceti, ER (1.91 gaa, 0.942 sv%)
B. J. Boxma, KOO (2.25 gaa, 0.900 sv%)
Daniel Manzato, VIC (2.79 gaa, 0.943 sv%)
Andrew Penner, GUE (3.25 gaa, 0.873 sv%)
Daniel Boisclair, VIC (4.22 gaa, 0.880 sv%)

Award winners
Stafford Smythe Memorial Trophy (MVP): Danny Groulx, Victoriaville
George Parsons Trophy (Sportsmanship): Tomas Plihal, Kootenay
Hap Emms Memorial Trophy (Goaltender): T. J. Aceti, Erie
Ed Chynoweth Trophy (Leading Scorer): Matthew Lombardi, Victoriaville

All-Star Team
Goal: T. J. Aceti (Erie)
Defence: Danny Groulx (Victoriaville), Kevin Dallman (Guelph)
Forwards: Matthew Lombardi (Victoriaville), Colin Sinclair (Kootenay), Cory Pecker (Erie)

References

External links
 Memorial Cup 
 Canadian Hockey League

Memorial Cup 2002
2002
Sport in Guelph